Robbie Seay Band Live is a live album by the Robbie Seay Band.

Track listing

2003 live albums
2003 EPs
Live EPs
Robbie Seay Band albums